Mike Moh (born August 19, 1983) is an American actor and martial artist of Korean descent. A sixth degree black belt in American Taekwondo, Moh is perhaps best known for his roles as martial arts legend Bruce Lee in the 2019 film Once Upon a Time in Hollywood, and Ryu in the web series of Street Fighter: Assassin's Fist (2014) and Resurrection (2016) or in the FOX drama series Empire where he made a few appearances.

He also played Triton in the television series Marvel's Inhumans. 

Moh is also the founder of Moh's Martial Arts in Waunakee, Wisconsin.

Personal life
Moh was born in Atlanta, Georgia to Korean parents. He grew up in Saint Paul, Minnesota, and attended the Carlson School of Management at the University of Minnesota, graduating with a degree in business marketing. He is married to Richelle Kondratowicz. They have two sons and a daughter.

Filmography

Film

Television

Video games

References

External links
 
 
 
 
 

1983 births
Living people
American male actors of Korean descent
American male television actors
American male taekwondo practitioners
American Jeet Kune Do practitioners
American stunt performers
Actors from Redondo Beach, California
Male actors from Atlanta